The School, Mount Victoria, also known as The School, Mt Victoria, was an independent, non-denominational, boarding school for boys, located in Mount Victoria, a small township in the Blue Mountains of New South Wales, Australia.

History
Opened on 18 July 1885, the school was designed and run by the proprietor and principal Henry Guenther Rienits (1851 –1928). Although Rienits was a naturalized Australian citizen, he was of German birth and so was forced by war-time legislation to close The School during 1916.

Campus and facilities
The campus was situated amongst ornamental trees and gardens on eight acres. The main building contained a large schoolroom, dining hall and lavatories on the ground floor, with dormitories on the upper floor.  Facilities included a swimming pool fed by springs, rifle range, tennis court and gymnasium.

Students and studies
The students came from the suburbs of Sydney and from the far west of the state. The School generally provided a commercial education with an emphasis on business, bookkeeping and shorthand, leading to the junior certificate. Pupils were also prepared for university entry if required. By 1906, more than 600 boys had attended The School, and 90 students had passed different examinations leading to tertiary study. The boys wore a uniform and there was a drum and fife band.

Notable alumni
 Air Vice Marshal William Bostock CB, DSO, OBE (1892 –1968), a senior commander in the Royal Australian Air Force
 Lionel Clive Ball (1877 –1955), Chief Geologist, Geological Survey of Queensland

References

Defunct schools in New South Wales
Educational institutions established in 1885
Former boarding schools in New South Wales
Defunct boys' schools in Australia
1885 establishments in Australia
Mount Victoria, New South Wales
Educational institutions disestablished in 1916